Shane may refer to:

People 
 Shane (actress) (born 1969), American pornographic actress
 Shane (New Zealand singer) (born 1946)
 iamnotshane (born 1995), formerly known as Shane, American singer
 Shane (name), a masculine given name and a surname, including a list of people and fictional characters with this name

Arts, entertainment, and media

Literature and adaptations
 Shane (novel), a 1949 Western novel by Jack Schaefer 
 Shane (film), a 1953 movie based on Schaefer's book
 Shane (American TV series), a 1966 American television series based on Schaefer's book, starring David Carradine, that aired on ABC

Other uses in arts, entertainment, and media
 Shane (British TV series), 2004 sitcom written by and starring Frank Skinner
 The Shanes (German band), a German rock band
 The Shanes (Swedish band), a Swedish rock band

Other uses
 1994 Shane, an asteroid
 Shane Company, a jewelry store
 Shane English School, an English conversation school in Japan
 Oromo Liberation Army, an armed group in Ethiopia that the country's government calls "OLF-Shene", also spelled "Shane"

See also
 Shayne (disambiguation)